Caloptilia ptychospora is a moth of the family Gracillariidae. It is known from the Democratic Republic of Congo.

References

ptychospora
Insects of the Democratic Republic of the Congo
Moths of Africa
Moths described in 1938
Endemic fauna of the Democratic Republic of the Congo